This is a list of current and former Roman Catholic churches in the Roman Catholic Diocese of Stockton. The diocese consists of eight deaneries in the Central Valley and Mother Lode region of California. The mother church of the diocese is the Cathedral of the Annunciation in Stockton, California.

Deanery I

Deanery II

Deanery III

Deanery IV

Deanery V

Deanery VI

Deanery VII

Deanery VIII

References

 
Stockton